The Natchez-Adams School District is a public school district based in Natchez, Mississippi (USA). The district's boundaries parallel that of Adams County.

Schools
Natchez High School
Fallin Career and Technology Center
McLaurin Elementary School
Morgantown Middle School
Joseph Frazier Elementary School
Susie B. West Elementary School
Natchez Freshman Academy
Robert Lewis Magnet School
Natchez Early College

Former North Natchez High School closed in 1989.

Demographics

2006-07 school year
There were a total of 4,305 students enrolled in the Natchez-Adams School District during the 2006–2007 school year. The gender makeup of the district was 49% female and 51% male. The racial makeup of the district was 88.97% African American, 10.45% White, 0.39% Hispanic, and 0.19% Asian. 87.0% of the district's students were eligible to receive free lunch.

Previous school years

Accountability statistics

See also
List of school districts in Mississippi

References

External links
 

Education in Adams County, Mississippi
School districts in Mississippi